El Campeón soy yo is a 1960 Argentine film directed by Virgilio Muguerza. It stars Pablo Palitos, Beatriz Taibo, Héctor Méndez and Paulette Christian.

Plot
An individual is forced to pose as a famous boxer.

Cast
  Pablo Palitos
  Beatriz Taibo
  Héctor Méndez
  Paulette Christian
  Mario Díaz
  Kid Gavilán
  Cayetano Biondo
  Lalo Malcolm
  Susana Latou

Reception
Jorge Miguel Couselo described the film in Correo de la Tarde as a "Lamentable accomplishment".

References

External links
 

1960 films
1960s Spanish-language films
Argentine black-and-white films
1960s Argentine films